William McDermid (1881–1958) was a New Zealand cricketer. He played in two first-class matches for Wellington in 1906/07.

See also
 List of Wellington representative cricketers

References

External links
 

1881 births
1958 deaths
New Zealand cricketers
Wellington cricketers
Cricketers from Melbourne